Serge Klarsfeld (born 17 September 1935) is a Romanian-born French activist and Nazi hunter known for documenting the Holocaust in order to establish the record and to enable the prosecution of war criminals. Since the 1960s, he has made notable efforts to commemorate the Jewish victims of German-occupied France and has been a supporter of Israel.

Early years 
Serge Klarsfeld was born in Bucharest into a family of Romanian Jews. They migrated to France before the Second World War began. In 1943, his father was arrested by the SS in Nice during a roundup ordered by Alois Brunner. Deported to the Auschwitz concentration camp, Klarsfeld's father died there. Young Serge was cared for in a home for Jewish children operated by the Œuvre de secours aux enfants, a French Jewish humanitarian organisation.  His mother and sister also survived the war in Vichy France, helped by the underground French Resistance beginning in late 1943.

Life
He helped found and has led the Sons and Daughters of Jewish Deportees from France (Association des fils et filles des déportés juifs de France) or FFDJF. It is one of the groups that has documented cases and located former German and French officials for prosecution such as Klaus Barbie, René Bousquet, Jean Leguay, Maurice Papon and Paul Touvier, who had been implicated in the deaths of hundreds of thousands of French and foreign Jews during the Second World War. The Klarsfelds were among organised groups who filed cases decades after the war, sometimes as late as the 1990s, against such officials for crimes against humanity.

In the years before 1989 and the break-up of the Soviet Union, the Klarsfelds (Serge Klarsfeld and his wife Beate) frequently protested against the Eastern Bloc's support for the PLO and anti-Zionism.

Recognition for their work has included France's Legion of Honour in 1984.  In 1986, their story was adapted as an American television film starring Tom Conti, Farrah Fawcett and Geraldine Page. In 2008, a French television movie was made about them.

On 1 January 2014, the Klarsfelds' Legion of Honour ranks were upgraded: Serge became Grand officier.

On 26 October 2015, the UNESCO designated the Klarsfelds as "Honorary Ambassadors and Special Envoys for Education about the Holocaust and the Prevention of Genocide".

Marriage and family
Serge married Beate Künzel in 1963 and settled in Paris. Their son,  (born 1965), became a human rights attorney and worked for Nicolas Sarkozy while he was minister of the interior.

Activism

Early activism
In 2012 the archivist of the Stasi revealed that Beate Klarsfeld's attack on German Chancellor Kurt Georg Kiesinger by publicly slapping him on 7 November 1968  was carried out in agreement with and the support of the government of East Germany, which was conducting a campaign against West German politicians (see Braunbuch). Beate Klarsfeld was paid 2,000 DM by the Stasi for her actions. Both Serge and Beate Klarsfeld were revealed to have been regular Stasi contacts. According to the State Commissioner for the Stasi Archives of Saxony, they cooperated with the Stasi in the 1960s in blackmailing West German politicians for Second World War activities.

In 1974, Serge and Beate Klarsfeld were both convicted in West Germany on felony charges of attempted kidnapping of Kurt Lischka, a former Gestapo chief whose prosecution in Germany was prevented by legal technicalities, in Cologne in order to transport him to France for prosecution. After conviction of felony charges, they were each sentenced to two months in prison. Following international protests, the sentence was suspended. Activism by the Klarsfelds and by descendants of Lischka's victims eventually resulted in changes to the laws. In 1980, Lischka was convicted of a felony in West Germany and sentenced to prison.

Attack on the Klarsfelds
The Klarsfelds' activities and methods generated controversy. On 9 July 1979, the Klarsfelds were the targets of a car bombing at their home in France. No one was in the car when the bomb detonated, and no one was injured in the vicinity of the blast. Individuals purporting to represent the Nazi ODESSA claimed responsibility for the attack.

Later activism
They are notable in the postwar decades for having been involved in hunting and finding German Nazis and French Vichy officials responsible for the worst abuses of the Holocaust, in order to prosecute them for alleged war crimes. Several officials were indicted due in part to the work of the Klarsfelds; they included the following, with the years of their convictions or deaths in parentheses: 
Klaus Barbie (1987)
René Bousquet (1993)
Jean Leguay (1989)
Maurice Papon (1998)
Paul Touvier (1994)

In the 1970s the Klarsfelds considered kidnapping Barbie in much the same way the Mossad did Eichmann but the plan fell through. They decided instead to bring international pressure to force his extradition.

By 1995, only four senior French Vichy officials had been indicted for war crimes, and by that year, only Paul Touvier had stood trial. Like Touvier, the former Vichy official Maurice Papon was convicted of war crimes in 1998.

The Klarsfelds continued to publicize the wartime activities of prominent politicians in Germany and Austria. In 1986 the Klarsfelds campaigned against former United Nations Secretary-General Kurt Waldheim, who was elected President of Austria amid allegations that he had covered up his wartime activities as an officer in the Wehrmacht.

In 1996, during the warfare in the former Yugoslavia, the Klarsfelds joined the outcry against Radovan Karadžić and Ratko Mladić for alleged war crimes and genocide of Bosnian Muslims.

In December 2009, Serge Klarsfeld defied an existing consensus within the Jewish community by saying that the beatification of Pope Pius XII was an internal matter of the Church. He said that Jews should not get too involved in the process. Many protested the beatification on the grounds that Pius XII had contributed to the persecution of Jews throughout Europe, and had not brought the power of the church against the Nazis.

Activism in France
In France in 1979 the Klarsfelds created l'Association des fils et filles des déportés juifs de France (Association of the sons and daughters of Jews deported from France) or FFDJF. It defends the cause of the descendants of deportees, to have the events recognised and to prosecute people responsible. In 1981, the association commissioned a memorial in Israel to the deported French Jews; it bears the name, date and place of birth of 80,000 French victims of the Nazi extermination. About 80,000 trees were planted to shape a forest of remembrance. Serge Klarsfeld is also vice-president of the Fondation pour la Mémoire de la Shoah.

In 1989 FFDJF was one of the groups to file a case against René Bousquet, head of the French Police in the Vichy government, for crimes against humanity. He was indicted by the French government in 1991, but killed in 1993 shortly before his trial was to begin.

The Klarsfelds' work on behalf of the descendants of Jewish deportees was formally recognised by President Jacques Chirac in a 1995 speech. He acknowledged the nation's responsibility for the fate of Jews in its territory during the Second World War. The government passed a law on 13 July 2000 to establish compensation for orphans whose parents were victims of anti-Semitic persecution.

On 7 July 2010, Serge Klarsfeld was awarded the title of commandeur de la Légion d'honneur by Prime Minister François Fillon at Hôtel Matignon, the official residence of France's Prime Minister.

In January 2012, the Klarsfelds, along with prominent French-Armenian singer Charles Aznavour, director Robert Guédiguian, and philosophers Bernard-Henri Lévy and Michel Onfray, signed an appeal to the French Parliament to ratify a bill to establish penalties for people who deny the Armenian genocide.

In July 2018, the Klarsfelds were profiled at length on CNN, which noted their swing away from Nazi hunting to a more-general push for social justice in opposition to the modern right. Today, they fight for human life, freedom, and social protection.

Works
In 1978, Serge Klarsfeld published Mémorial de la Déportation des Juifs de France (Memorial of the Deportation of the Jews of France), a book listing the names of more than 80,000 Jews deported from France to concentration camps or killed in France. Copies of the original lists that were typed up for each deportation train, found by the Klarsfelds in an archive of the Jewish community in Paris, were the basis for the name, place, date of birth and nationality of all deportees, who were listed according to each deportation train. The book records more than 75,700 Jews who were deported to the concentration camps from France and establishes that just 2,564 of the deportees survived the war. Most of the deportees were sent from the transit camp at Drancy, ranging in age from newly born to 93 and originating from 37 countries, the most from France (22,193) and Poland (14,459), with a small number from the United States (10) and even one from Tahiti. In 2012, Klarsfeld published an updated version of the Memorial, adding women's maiden names, deportees last address in France and the transit or internment camp they went through. This list is sorted in alphabetic order. From 2018, this memorial is also available as an online search engine.

Serge Klarsfeld wrote a preface to Une adolescence perdue dans la nuit des camps by Henri Kichka.

Serge Klarsfeld and his wife Beate co-wrote an autobiography, Hunting the Truth: Memoirs of Beate and Serge Klarsfeld, published in 2018.

Cooperation with the Stasi
Since the reunification of Germany and the opening of Stasi files, in 2012 Lutz Rathenow, the State Commissioner for the Stasi Archives of Saxony, has stated that Beate Klarsfeld cooperated with the Stasi of East Germany in the 1960s. They gave her material containing incriminating information about the wartime activities of West German politicians. The cooperation of both Beate and Serge Klarsfeld with the Stasi and their status as contacts was also documented in a new book by former Stasi officers, Günter Bohnsack and Herbert Brehmer.

Later years in Germany
In May 2015, Beate Klarsfeld and her husband Serge received the German Federal Cross of Merit, in recognition of their efforts to bring Nazi war criminals to justice.

Honours 
 2014: Grand Officer of the Legion of Honour
 2015: Officer of the Order of Saint-Charles.

Representation in other media
The Klarsfelds' activities related to finding Nazi war criminals were the subject of Nazi Hunter: The Beate Klarsfeld Story (1986), an American made-for-TV film.
The documentary La traque des nazis, (2007) studied Simon Wiesenthal's and the Klarsfelds' activities.
The 2008 drama La traque was a French made-for-TV film, written by Alexandra Deman and Laurent Jaoui and directed by Laurent Jaoui, based on the Klarsfelds.
The 2001 documentary Marlene Dietrich: Her Own Song, a Turner Classic Movies Production about Dietrich mentions her support of Klarsfeld's anti-Nazi activities.

See also
 Michel Thomas
 Efraim Zuroff

Notes

Bibliography of works in English
The Children of Izieu: A Human Tragedy. New York: Harry N. Abrams Publishers, 1985.  Translation of Les enfants d'Izieu (1985)
French Children of the Holocaust: A Memorial. New York: New York University Press, 1996.  Translation of Le mémorial des enfants juifs déportés de France (1995)

External links

The Klarsfeld Foundation (biographies and chronology of activities)

1986 film

2008 film

Romanian emigrants to France
Romanian Jews
Living people
People from Bucharest
Married couples
Nazi hunters
Commandeurs of the Légion d'honneur
The Left (Germany) politicians
21st-century German politicians
1935 births
Historians of the Holocaust
Officers Crosses of the Order of Merit of the Federal Republic of Germany
People of the Stasi
Jewish anti-fascists
Jewish socialists